Mohamed ElShorbagy (born 12 January 1991 in Alexandria) is an Egyptian-English professional squash player. He represented Egypt from a young age until June 2022, and is currently representing England. He reached a career-high world ranking of World No. 1 in November 2014, March 2018, February 2020, and again in July 2021. He won the Manchester open on 22 September 2020 after 192 days of recess due to the COVID-19 pandemic, for his 42nd PSA title, and winning the El Gouna Classic on 28 May 2021 for his 43rd PSA title, moving him to fifth on the all-time squash win list. ElShorbagy’s victory in New Zealand in November 2022, for his 47th PSA title, also sees him become the youngest man ever to reach 500 PSA wins at the age of 31 years and 10 months. While he is only the third man to achieve that milestone after his coach Gregory Gaultier (587) and Nick Matthew (518), he backed up his New Zealand win with a win over Diego Elias at the MARIGOLD Singapore open on the 20th of November, 2022, to mark his 505th PSA win, and his 48th title in 75 finals. He has since surpassed this feat, recording his 49th title (joint 4th in titles) in the 2023 black ball gold tournament.

Early life
El Shorbagy attended Millfield School (2006–2009).

Career overview
One of the most talented players on the PSA World Tour, Mohamed ElShorbagy has flown up the world rankings since joining the PSA in 2006 as a 15-year old schoolboy under the tutelage of the legendary Jonah Barrington.

The Alexandria-born star rose to prominence in 2007 after he became the first player in history to secure a maiden PSA World Tour title at a five star event.

He then entered the record books again soon after, becoming only the second man after Ramy Ashour to win the World Junior Championship twice when he triumphed in 2008 and 2009. The Egyptian came close to winning the senior World Championship in 2012 after beating James Willstrop in a five-game semi-final thriller but lost out to compatriot Ramy Ashour in the final.

In 2013 he claimed his first World Series win in the Qatar Classic and exhibited some supreme form throughout the 2014 campaign, winning five events including World Series tournaments at the Hong Kong and US Opens.

ElShorbagy entered the record books behind only Pakistani legends Jahangir and Jansher Khan, who both topped the charts aged 18, and compatriot Ramy Ashour, who became number one aged 22, courtesy of his victory over Grégory Gaultier in the semi-finals of the 2014 Delaware Investments US Open and Nick Matthew's defeat to four-time World Champion Amr Shabana in the other last four encounter.
"It feels unbelievable right now," said ElShorbagy. "It's been a dream to get to that spot and I can't believe I'm there right now. I came into this tournament knowing there was a big chance to get that World No.1 ranking for the first time in my life." In 2013, Mohamed made it to the semifinals at the Kuwait PSA Cup, a now defunct World Series Platinum event.

In 2014, ElShorbagy opened his year by making the semifinals of Tournament of Champions; he lost to Grégory Gaultier in four games. In the PSA World Series Finals, ElShorbagy recorded his first win over Ramy Ashour, beating Ashour 11–5, 11–5 in the round-robin stage. ElShorbagy lost a heartbreaking match against Tarek Momen after having match points. ElShorbagy then beat James Willstrop 11–9, 11–7, recording his second win in the round-robin stage and also qualifying him for the semifinals. In the semifinals ElShorbagy beat Nick Matthew in five games to reach the final. ElShorbagy was playing Ramy Ashour, whom he beat earlier that week; Ashour recorded two wins after their match to qualify  to the semis, and then Ashour beat Gaultier to set up a rematch. Ashour this time was the victor, winning in a tough 4 games. ElShorbagy made the semifinals of the Windy City Open, again losing to Gaultier in four games. ElShorbagy continued good form by making the final of the 2014 El Gouna International. He got revenge on Gaultier, beating him in four games, but lost in the final to countryman Ramy Ashour in four games.

He lost a second World Championship final, against compatriot Ashour, during the 2014 tournament in Qatar in what was dubbed one of the greatest squash matches ever. The Egyptian recovered from his World Championship heartbreak to lift the Tournament of Champions title in January 2015 and, after finishing runner-up at both the Windy City Open and the El Gouna International, he won the British Open for the first time in his career, beating Gaultier in the final. ElShorbagy lifted the British Grand Prix title in September 2015 before celebrating 12 months at the summit of the World Rankings the following month. After claiming another PSA World Series triumph at the Qatar Classic in November, he dropped out of the World Championship at third round stage after a shock exit to James Willstrop as his search for the sport's biggest prize continued.

However, a spell-binding run of form from December 2015 to April 2016 saw ElShorbagy dominate the PSA World Tour, bringing him up to six successive World Series title wins, including defending his crown at the British Open after ending a four-match winless run against Ramy Ashour. During that period, ElShorbagy also broke Ashour's record for the highest ever World Rankings points average in April, a record he then shattered again a month later. A superb season was rounded off in style when he was crowned the 2016 PSA Men's Player of the Year.

ElShorbagy started the 2016/17 season fairly strongly with another victory at the U.S. Open, but he missed out on becoming the first player to win the Qatar Classic on three successive occasions after a final defeat to compatriot Karim Abdel Gawad - just a month after Gawad had beaten him in the World Championship semi-final. However, the following month saw ElShorbagy become only the third Egyptian player to spend a whole year at the summit of the World Rankings after he topped the December 2016 World Rankings. ElShorbagy suffered a slump in form during the 2016/17 season with the former World No.1 suffering from his longest title drought in three years. The Egyptian lost in the semi-final of the British Open to England's Nick Matthew and then exited at the quarter final stage of the El Gouna International Squash Open after defeat by young brother, Marwan ElShorbagy. However, ElShorbagy's fortunes changed at the season-ending PSA Dubai World Series Finals as he downed England's James Willstrop 3–0 in the final to finish the season with a title.

ElShorbagy dominated the early part of the 2017/2018 season, winning seven of his first nine tournaments including the Netsuite Open, the Channel VAS Championships, the Qatar Classic, the Hong Kong Open, the Canary Wharf Classic, and the Windy City Open.

On 6 June 2022, ElShorbagy decided to change allegiance to represent England. On 8 June 2022, he won his first game since allegiance change at the Mauritius Open defeating compatriot James Willstrop.

World Open final appearances

1 title & 4 runner-up

Major World Series final appearances

British Open: 4 finals (3 titles, 1 runner-up)

Hong Kong Open: 3 finals (3 titles, 0 runner-up)

Tournament of Champions: 4 finals (3 titles, 1 runner-up)

Qatar Classic: 4 finals (3 titles, 1 runner-up)

US Open: 5 finals (3 titles, 2 runner-ups)

Windy City Open: 3 finals (2 titles, 1 runner-up)

El Gouna International: 3 finals (1 title, 2 runner-up)

Notes

References

External links
 
 

1991 births
Living people
Egyptian male squash players
Sportspeople from Alexandria
Naturalised citizens of the United Kingdom
People educated at Millfield